The fountains in Leipzig were originally built as part of the city's water supply and in the 19th and 20th centuries others were added for decorative functions. They are regarded as objects of historical and art historical interest.

Water supply

Decorative

"Badender Knabe" and "Badendes Mädchen"
In connection with the restoration and reconstruction work of the Old City Hall at the marketplace from 1906 until 1909, there were built two fountains „Badender Knabe“ (German: Bathing knave, Sculptor: Carl Seffner) and „Badendes Mädchen“ (German: Bathing girl). They are in a niche inside and in front of the passage on the town hall's side towards the Naschmarkt. The sculpture of the girl has been made by Johannes Hartmann in 1906. After it has been stolen, it was recreated in 2000 by the Leipzig sculptor Klaus Schwabe.

Löwenbrunnen

It is located on the Naschmarkt opposite the main entrance of the Madler Passage and was built in 1918, on the location of buildings dating from 1690. Its fountain is reached by three steps that surround it and is decorated with mythical creatures and marine sandstone reliefs. On the copper painted hood, there was a pyramid,  crowned at the tip with a golden sun.

Around 1820 there was a decorated  pump handle in the form of an iron lion and designed by the Berlin sculptor Johann Gottfried Schadow and cast by Lauchhammert. It was incorporated into the lion fountain designed by the Leipzig Oberbaurat Hugo Licht. There is a Versalinschrift on the back of the fountain which reads "In the last war in 1918, this fountain in the shape of the old wooden housing has been rebuilt from the rate by the architect Dr. Ing. Hugo Lucht. The funds were donated by the Hugo Haschke Company."

Mägdebrunnen

Märchenbrunnen

Mendebrunnen

The Mende Fountain is located at Augustusplatz in front of the Gewandhaus (Concert Hall). It is the largest fountain in Leipzig and cost 189,000 gold marks to construct. It was built by Adolf Gnauth in 1883–86. Pauline Mende, a merchant's widow, bequeathed her money to Leipzig for building a fountain. In honor to her Leipzig give the fountain her name.

Rathausbrunnen

Villersbrunnen

References

(Incorporates information translated from the German Wikipedia)

Buildings and structures in Leipzig
Tourist attractions in Leipzig